Chibombo District is a district of Central Province, Zambia. As of the 2010 Zambian Census, the district had a population of 293,765 people. It consists of two constituencies, namely Keembe and Katuba. 

Its headquarters are at Chibombo, and it lies between the Lukanga Swamp in the west and the end of the Luangwa Valley in the east. It includes good commercial farmland north of Lusaka. Most of the people occupying this place are low-scale commercial farmers. Chibombo has attracted the interest of people from more developed areas of the country like Lusaka, and the Copperbelt provinces. 

The area is seeing a lot of development in recent times. A village in Chibombo called Chipansha has seen a lot invested in the education of its young boys and girls with the installment of an orphanage.  

An organisation called Our Moon Education has also set up its headquarters in the area. Its students offer a lot of teaching to the local pupils.  

The sparsely populated district still recognises a traditional hierarchy of leadership. They have a Chief and many Headmen who look after the smaller constituent villages.

External links 

 Our Moon Education

References

Districts of Central Province, Zambia